Baasch, born Bartosz Schmidt, is a Polish musician, composer, and record producer from Warsaw. His music primarily falls into the indie pop and synth-pop genres. Schmidt is also a member of the bands Miennta and Plazmatikon.

In 2013, Baasch released the four-track EP Simple Dark Romantic Songs on the Sensefloor label. The same year, he composed music for the film Floating Skyscrapers. His second EP, Siamese Sister, followed in 2014. That year, Baasch signed a deal with Nextpop and published his debut album, Corridors. The record produced two singles: "Several Gods" and "Shout". His sophomore album, Re_Corr, came out in 2016 and consisted of remixes of songs from Corridor by various artists. On 21 April 2017, the musician issued his third studio album, Grizzly Bear with a Million Eyes, from which came the singles "Kind of Coma" and "Dare to Take (feat. Mary Komasa)".

In 2020, Baasch issued his first Polish-language album, titled Noc, spawning the singles "Brokat", "Cienie", and "Miasto". In 2021, he scored the musical Balladyna. Echa Grobowych Rozwalin and subsequently published Ncrmx, a collection of remixes of tracks from Noc by various artists.

Discography
Studio albums
 Corridors (2014)
 Grizzly Bear with a Million Eyes (2017)
 Noc (2020)

EPs
 Simple Dark Romantic Songs (2013)
 Siamese Sister (2014)

Remix albums
 Re_Corr (2016)
 Ncrmx (2021)

Soundtracks
 Floating Skyscrapers (2013)
 Balladyna. Echa Grobowych Rozwalin (2021)

Singles
 "Several Gods" (2014)
 "Shout" (2016)
 "Kind of Coma" (2017)
 "Dare to Take (feat. Mary Komasa) (2018)
 "Brokat" (2020)
 "Cienie" (2020)
 "Język" (2020)
 "Miasto" (2020)
 "Sportowa Warszawa (feat. Kacperczyk)" (2021)
 "Perfect Beach (with Rafał Dutkiewicz, Novika, and Meeting by Chance)" (2021)

Guest appearances and contributions
 Venter – "Fire" (2015)
 Rysy – Traveler (2015)
 Sotei – Sotei (2017)
 New Rome – "Childish Comeback (feat. Baasch)" (2019)

References

Polish male singers
Polish male musicians
Polish film score composers
Polish record producers
Musicians from Warsaw
Living people
Place of birth missing (living people)
Date of birth missing (living people)
Year of birth missing (living people)